"Fast Enough for You" is a 1993 song by the American band Phish. It is the second track from their 1993 concept album Rift and was released as their third promotional single by Elektra Records. The song is a slow-tempo ballad written by Phish guitarist and lead vocalist Trey Anastasio and lyricist Tom Marshall. The studio recording features a pedal steel guitar performed by Gordon Stone.

In "Fast Enough for You," Tom Marshall (lyricist) supposes that we wouldn’t burden each other as we do with weighty expectations and needs unmet, and things would be a whole lot happier. But that’s not the way it is, and the lover to whom our narrator speaks is not content with the pace of the affair. He is thus a target for her scorn.

The song was performed by Phish the most during the year of and the year following its release. It has since become a scarcity among live shows and turns up about twice a year.

Track listing

"Fast Enough for You" (Edit of LP Version) (Trey Anastasio, Tom Marshall) - 4:01

Personnel
Musicians
Trey Anastasio – guitars, vocals
Page McConnell – keyboards, vocals
Mike Gordon – bass guitar, vocals
Jon Fishman – drums, vocals
Gordon Stone – pedal steel

Also appears on
Live Phish Volume 12 (2002)
Live Phish Volume 18 (2003)
At the Roxy (2008)

Notes

1993 songs
Phish songs
Songs written by Trey Anastasio
Songs written by Tom Marshall (singer)
Song recordings produced by Barry Beckett
Elektra Records singles
1993 singles